Verdun is a small town in the Adelaide Hills, Australia, on the road from Hahndorf to Balhannah.  At the 2011 Australian Census the town recorded a population of 662.

Verdun is approximately 4 km from Hahndorf and 5 km from Bridgewater. There is one school, one pub and a licensed café/restaurant situated in the building previously occupied by a service station and general store. There is a cafe across the road from the local pub as well as a busy restaurant named Grunthal (named after the original German name of Verdun) near the freeway.

Verdun originally had the German name Grunthal, after being named by the Prussian settlers who established the town. The town was renamed in 1917 after one of the bloodiest battles of the First World War, the Battle of Verdun.

The Hills Christian Community School opened in February 1983 at the site of the former Verdun Primary School.

See also

 Australian place names changed from German names

References

Towns in South Australia